Doriane Bontemps (born in 1967) is a French former ice dancer. With Charles Paliard, she won bronze at the 1985 World Junior Championships, after placing sixth a year earlier. They won two senior international medals — bronze at the 1985 Nebelhorn Trophy and silver at the 1985 Grand Prix International St. Gervais. In the 1987–88 season, Bontemps competed with Albérick Dallongeville.

References 

1967 births
French female ice dancers
Living people
Sportspeople from Lyon
World Junior Figure Skating Championships medalists
20th-century French women